Wiraqucha Pirqa (Quechua wira fat, qucha lake, wiraqucha or Wiraqucha mister, sir, gentleman / god / one of the greatest Andean divinities (Wiraqucha) / the eighth emperor of the Tawantinsuyu (Wiraqucha Inka), pirqa wall) is an archaeological site in Peru. There is a little pre-Hispanic town and a stone forest containing caves with cave paintings.

See also 
 Inka Wasi

References 

Archaeological sites in Peru
Archaeological sites in Huancavelica Region
Rock art in South America